John Herbert Varley (born August 9, 1947) is an American science fiction writer.

Biography
Varley was born in Austin, Texas. He grew up in Fort Worth, moved to Port Arthur in 1957, graduated from Nederland High School—all in Texas—and went to Michigan State University on a National Merit Scholarship.           He started as a physics major, switched to English, then left school before his 20th birthday and arrived in Haight-Ashbury district of San Francisco just in time for the "Summer of Love" in 1967. There he worked at various unskilled jobs, depended on St. Anthony's Mission for meals, and panhandled outside the Cala Market on Stanyan Street (since closed) before deciding that writing had to be a better way to make a living. He was serendipitously present at Woodstock in 1969 when his car ran out of gas a half-mile away. He also has lived at various times in Portland and Eugene, Oregon, New York City, San Francisco again, Berkeley, and Los Angeles.

Varley has written several novels (his first attempt, Gas Giant, was, he admits, "pretty bad") and numerous short stories, many of them in a future history, "The Eight Worlds". These stories are set a century or two after a race of mysterious and omnipotent aliens, the Invaders, have almost completely eradicated humans from the Earth (they regard whales and dolphins to be the superior Terran lifeforms and humans only a dangerous infestation). But humans have inhabited virtually every other corner of the solar system, often through the use of biological modifications learned, in part, by eavesdropping on alien communications.

Varley's "Overdrawn at the Memory Bank" was adapted and televised for PBS in 1983. In addition, two of his short stories ("Options" and "Blue Champagne") were adapted into episodes of the short-lived 1998 Sci-Fi Channel TV series Welcome to Paradox.

Varley spent some years in Hollywood but the only tangible result of this stint was the film Millennium. Of his Millennium experience Varley said:

Varley is often compared to Robert A. Heinlein. In addition to a similarly descriptive writing style, similarities include free societies and free love. Two of his connected novels, Steel Beach and The Golden Globe, include a sub-society of Heinleiners. The Golden Globe also contains a society evolved from a prison colony on Pluto and a second society evolved from it on Pluto's moon, Charon, similar to the situation found in Heinlein's The Moon Is a Harsh Mistress. Unlike Heinlein's lunar society, Varley's convict society on Charon maintains its criminal ways and is similar to the Mafia or the yakuza. His Thunder and Lightning series plays on his connection with Heinlein by deriving its main characters' names from many of Heinlein's characters, including Jubal, Manuel Garcia, Kelly, Podkayne, Cassie, and Polly, and by frequently dropping titles of Heinlein's novels in the dialogue.

Bibliography

Novels

Short story collections
 The Persistence of Vision (1978) (UK: In the Hall of the Martian Kings)
 The Barbie Murders (1980) (republished as Picnic on Nearside, 1984)
 Blue Champagne (1986)
 The John Varley Reader: Thirty Years of Short Fiction (2004)
 Good-bye, Robinson Crusoe and Other Stories (2013)

Other
 Millennium – screenplay (1989) based on the short story "Air Raid" (as was the novel Millennium)

Awards
Varley has won the Hugo Award three times:
 1979 – Novella–"The Persistence of Vision"
 1982 – Short Story–"The Pusher"
 1985 – Novella–"Press Enter■"
and has been nominated a further twelve times.

He has won the Nebula Award twice:
 1979 – Novella–" The Persistence of Vision"
 1985 – Novella – "Press Enter■"
and has been nominated a further six times.

He has won the Locus Award ten times:
 1976 – Special Locus Award–four novelettes in Top 10 ("Bagatelle", "Gotta Sing, Gotta Dance", "Overdrawn at the Memory Bank", "The Phantom of Kansas")
 1979 – Novelette–"The Barbie Murders"
 1979 – Novella–"The Persistence of Vision"
 1979 – Single Author Collection–The Persistence of Vision
 1980 – SF Novel–Titan
 1981 – Single Author Collection–The Barbie Murders
 1982 – Novella–"Blue Champagne"
 1982 – Short Story–"The Pusher"
 1985 – Novella – "Press Enter■"
 1987 – Collection–Blue Champagne

Varley has also won the Jupiter Award, the Prix Tour-Apollo Award, several Seiun Awards, Endeavour Award, 2009 Robert A. Heinlein Award and others.

References

External links

 Interview by Clarkesworld Magazine (October 2012)
 Interview by Republibot.com
 
 
 
 
 Review of Varley's "Eight Worlds" stories by Jo Walton
 Varley Vade mecum: Bibliography, Gaea Maps

1947 births
Living people
20th-century American novelists
21st-century American novelists
American male novelists
American male short story writers
American science fiction writers
Hugo Award-winning writers
Nebula Award winners
Endeavour Award winners
People from Fort Worth, Texas
Novelists from Oregon
20th-century American short story writers
21st-century American short story writers
20th-century American male writers
21st-century American male writers
Novelists from Texas
Writers from Austin, Texas